{{Automatic taxobox
| image =
| image_caption =
| taxon = Polyblastia
| authority = A.Massal. (1852)
| type_species = Polyblastia cupularis
| type_species_authority = A.Massal. (1852)
| subdivision_ranks = Species
| subdivision =
| synonyms_ref = 
| synonyms = {{collapsible list|bullets=on
|Amphoroblastia 
|Holosporomyces 
|Lithothelidium 
|Magnussoniolichen 
|Magnussoniomyces 
|Phillippiregis 
|Polyblastia subgen. Polyblastidea 
|Polyblastidea 
|Polyblastiomyces 
|Porphyriospora 
|Raesaeneniolichen 
|Raesaeneniomyces 
}}
}}Polyblastia is a genus of lichenized fungi in the family Verrucariaceae. As of 2020, it consists of about 40 species combined with about 50 orphaned species.
The main difference with the genus Verrucaria is related to spores, which are muriform in Polyblastia.

Species
28 species, as accepted by Species Fungorum;

 Polyblastia agraria 
 Polyblastia albida 
 Polyblastia aurantia 
 Polyblastia aurorae 
 Polyblastia australis 
 Polyblastia baltica 
 Polyblastia borealis 
 Polyblastia cataractae 
 Polyblastia cupularis 
 Polyblastia dermatodes  
 Polyblastia dimidiata  
 Polyblastia efflorescens 
 Polyblastia fusca 
 Polyblastia gothica 
 Polyblastia helvetica 
 Polyblastia inconspicua 
 Polyblastia inumbrata 
 Polyblastia media 
 Polyblastia neglecta 
 Polyblastia nevoi 
 Polyblastia nordinii 
 Polyblastia philaea 
 Polyblastia potamophila 
 Polyblastia pulchra 
 Polyblastia quartzina 
 Polyblastia sendtneri 
 Polyblastia singularis 
 Polyblastia verrucosa''

References

Verrucariales
Lichen genera
Taxa described in 1852
Taxa named by Abramo Bartolommeo Massalongo